Memmi may refer to:

 Albert Memmi (1920–2020) French-Tunisian writer
 Lippo Memmi (–1356), Italian painter
 Lussivolutopsius memmi, a species of sea snail in the family Buccinidae

See also
 Memi (disambiguation)
 Memmo (disambiguation)